The State Employees' Union of Ukraine (SEUU) is a trade union representing workers in the public sector in Ukraine.

The union was established in 1990.  It affiliated to the Federation of Trade Unions of Ukraine (FPU).  By 2019, it was the fifth-largest affiliate of the FPU, with 200,000 members.

References

Public sector trade unions
Trade unions established in 1990
Trade unions in Ukraine